The Paldau Formation is a geologic formation in Austria. It preserves insect fossils dating back to the Tortonian stage of the Miocene period.

Fossil content 
The following fossils have been reported from the formation:
 Chlorocypha cordasevae
 Gyatermes styriensis
 Tipula paleopannonia

See also 
 List of fossiliferous stratigraphic units in Austria

References

Further reading 
 A. Nel, M. Gross, and M. S. Engel. 2017. First fossil occurrence of the jewel damselflies (Odonata: Chlorocyphidae): a new species from the Late Miocene of Styria, Austria. Annales de la Société Entomologique de France 53:280-285
 M. S. Engel and M. Gross. 2012. A new fossil crane fly from the early Pannonian of the Styrian basin (Diptera: Tipulidae). Journal of the Kansas Entomological Society 85:160-163
 M. S. Engel and M. Gross. 2009. A giant termite from the Late Miocene of Styria, Austria (Isoptera). Naturwissenschaften 96:289-295

Geologic formations of Austria
Miocene Series of Europe
Neogene Austria
Tortonian
Siltstone formations
Lacustrine deposits
Paleontology in Austria